Paras Dogra (born 19 November 1984) is an Indian cricketer who has played first-class cricket since 2001. He is a right-handed batsman.

Career
In November 2015, Dogra equalled the record of double centuries scored in the Ranji Trophy when he scored his seventh score of 200 runs or more.

For most of his career he played for Himachal Pradesh in the Ranji Trophy. In the Indian Premier League, he has played for Rajasthan Royals, Kings XI Punjab and Kolkata Knight Riders Ahead of the 2018–19 Ranji Trophy, he transferred from Himachal Pradesh to Puducherry. He was the leading run-scorer for Puducherry in the 2018–19 Vijay Hazare Trophy, with 257 runs in six matches.

In November 2018, Dogra became the first batsman for Puducherry to score a century in the Ranji Trophy. The following month, he scored 253 from 244 balls against Sikkim. It was his eighth double century, the most by a batsman in the Ranji Trophy. He was the leading run-scorer for Puducherry in the 2018–19 Ranji Trophy, with 729 runs in eight matches.

References

External links
 

1984 births
Living people
Cricketers from Himachal Pradesh
Indian cricketers
Himachal Pradesh cricketers
Rajasthan Royals cricketers
North Zone cricketers
Punjab Kings cricketers
Kolkata Knight Riders cricketers
Gujarat Lions cricketers
Kala Bagan Krira Chakra cricketers
Pondicherry cricketers